Wang Haitao (born 24 January 1997) is a Chinese footballer currently playing as a defender for Beijing BSU.

Career statistics

Club
.

References

1997 births
Living people
Chinese footballers
Association football defenders
China League One players
Beijing Sport University F.C. players
Beijing Guoan F.C. players